Jonuk (also Romanized as Jonūk) is a village in Marz Rural District, Chah Dadkhoda District, Qaleh Ganj County, Kerman Province, Iran. At the 2006 census, its population was 32, in 8 families.

References 

Populated places in Qaleh Ganj County